Bristol Water is a British water company which supplies 266 million litres of drinking water daily to over 1.2 million customers in a  area centred on Bristol, England.  It is regulated under the Water Industry Act 1991. Sewerage services in the Bristol area are provided by Wessex Water.

Approximately half the water is taken from the Mendip Hills, particularly Chew Valley Lake, Blagdon Lake, Cheddar Reservoir and Barrow Gurney Reservoirs, with the other half piped from the River Severn via the Gloucester and Sharpness Canal.

In June 2021, Pennon Group acquired Bristol Water for $563 million.

History
During the medieval period, Bristol had a remarkably efficient water supply, as there were a large number of wells and springs, and most streets had a wooden trough into which water was discharged. The troughs were supplied by local priories, as most of the wells and springs were also owned by religious foundations, but with the Dissolution of the Monasteries between 1536 and 1541, maintenance and upkeep of the system passed to parishes. As the population increased, they proved inadequate and started to become polluted. The first Bristol Waterworks Company was set up in 1695, and obtained water from Hanham Mills, on the edge of the city limits, which was piped into the main part of the city in hollowed-out elm pipes. The scheme was completed in 1698, but never worked well, as the company was not well organised or managed, and it gradually got into serious debt. The Corporation of Bristol were unwilling to take over the scheme, and the company became bankrupt in 1782.

The need for fresh water increased significantly between 1804 and 1809, when William Jessop carried out work to improve the facilities of Bristol Harbour, known as the Floating Harbour because water levels were unaffected by the tides. Large numbers of extra ships used the facilities, and needed their water tanks to be filled before putting back out to sea. There was an idea to build a canal from the Kennet and Avon Canal near Bath into Bristol, which would be used by boats and also as a water supply channel, but that scheme failed due to lack of funds after obtaining and enabling Act of Parliament in 1811. A Commission was appointed in 1844 to consider the state of large towns in England, and reported that Bristol was one of the worst large towns in respect of water supply. Most water came from wells, the water was hard, making it unsuitable for washing, and the difficulty of obtaining the water meant that it was used very sparingly.

By the spring of 1845, there were two groups attempting to supply Bristol with water. The Merchant Venturers Company had proposed a scheme to supply the area of Clifton with water from two springs on the banks of the River Avon. Although that scheme had not been authorised in 1842, their proposal was to extend it, and they had enlisted the support of Isambard Kingdom Brunel as engineer. Edwin Chadwick and Thomas Hawksley had failed to persuade them that they should implement a combined water supply and drainage scheme, as just supplying water often led to worse sanitary conditions, with cesspits overflowing if there was no network of sewers to carry waste away. The second group proposed bringing water from the Mendip Hills and other springs in Somerset, and after some consideration of various engineers at a meeting held in the Bristol Corn Exchange on 20 June 1845, appointed James Simpson, based on his wide experience of water supply projects. In the ensuing Parliamentary battle, the second group won, becoming the Bristol Water Company.

Line of works
The company, formally known as Bristol Waterworks Company, was formed on 16 July 1846 by an Act of Parliament. The first general meeting was held in the White Lion Hotel on Broad Street, when members of the first committee included William Budd, a physician who helped control cholera outbreaks in Bristol, and Francis Fry of the Fry family, better known for producing chocolate. The 1846 Act authorised the construction of Simpson's "Line of Works", an  aqueduct designed to carry water from Chewton and Litton to Barrow Gurney. This fed into a tunnel cut through a ridge of magnesium limestone conglomerate, after which a rivetted wrought iron tube carried the water over the Harptree ravine. The pipes had an average gradient of around 10 inches per mile (16 cm per km), but the gradient was not uniform, and there was a high point on Breach Hill Lane, to the south of Chew Stoke.

A reservoir was constructed at Barrow Gurney to receive the water, and because the springs at Chewton were the source of the River Chew, the company was required to build three compensation reservoirs, so that the flow in the river could be maintained. Two were constructed at Litton, with a third on the Winford Brook near Chew Magna. Water was fed into the supply system from three service reservoirs. Cotham reservoir was fed by gravity from Barrow Gurney, and some of its water was then pumped to Durdham Down reservoir, which was outside the city limits at the time. The third reservoir at Bedminster Down supplied the district to the south of the harbour, and was fed by gravity from Cold Bath spring, a little to the west of Barrow Gurney.

In 1862 they therefore obtained another Act of Parliament to authorise the construction of a second reservoir at Barrow. However, there was very little rain in the winters of 1861, 1862 and 1863, resulting in the yield from the springs that fed the first reservoir being seriously depleted. The 1862 Act also required them to build a compensation reservoir at Barrow Gurney, to enable mills to keep operating. Barrow No. 2 reservoir was finished in 1866, and the two reservoirs could store , representing 88 days at the maximum rate of supply. Meanwhile, they had obtained the Bristol Waterworks Amendments Act 1865, which allowed them to obtain water from springs at Chelvey and Migdel, several miles to the west of Barrow Gurney. Simpson anticipated that they might need to extract ground water in due course, and sited the Chelvey pumping station at a location where wells could be driven down into the underlying red sandstone.

They began to be run intermittently from May 1867, and were in regular use from July 1868. Simpson did not live to see wells being constructed, as he died in 1869, but work began in the following year, and many wells and boreholes were eventually constructed. The original pumps were scrapped in 1937.

Development

Women were first employed at Bristol Waterworks during the First World War. By April 1942 female staff had entirely replaced men on night telephone duty.

Years of planning and design work for the Chew Valley Lake Scheme as a reservoir for the city culminated in the obtaining of the Bristol Waterworks Act 1939 on 28 July 1939. It was the largest and most expensive project in the company's history, but less than two months later, the Second World War began, and all capital work was suspended until it was over. The first sod was cut on 10 July 1946, as part of the centenary celebrations of the company. The temporary intake, pumping station and link to the line of works had been authorised in 1944 during a severe drought, although the full scheme as described in the 1939 Act would not receive permission to proceed until 1948. Queen Elizabeth II inaugurated Chew Valley Lake on 17 April 1956, accompanied by the Duke of Edinburgh. On 24 November 1940 the Bristol Blitz caused 95 fractured water mains in the city but by 28 November the water system in the city was restored to normal.

During the 1950s and 1960s, the area supplied by Bristol Waterworks increased steadily. Portishead District Water Company was taken over on 1 January 1952, Long Ashton Rural District Council (RDC) followed on 1 April 1952 and Clevedon Water Company on 1 January 1953. Discussions on amalgamation with West Gloucester Waterworks Company had begun in 1955, but on 26 September 1956, the Ministry of Housing and Local Government published a circular suggesting that the existing water supply undertakings in the country, then numbering over 1,000, should be radically reduced. Amalgamation with West Gloucester was agreed, and most of the 16 water supply undertakings in the Mendip Hills started negotiating with Bristol Waterworks. In 1957, agreements for takeover were concluded with Axbridge RDC, Shepton Mallet Waterworks Company and Glastonbury Corporation, and discussions with five other undertakings were well advanced.

Actual amalgamations took place on 1 January 1959 with Shepton Mallet Waterworks Company, who had just celebrated their centenary on 12 December 1958, with Glastonbury Corporation on 1 April 1959, with West Gloucestershire Water Company on 1 July 1959 and with Wells RDC on 1 October 1959. The water supply undertakings run by Clutton RDC and Shepton Mallet RDC were taken over on 1 April 1960, with Weston-super-Mare following on 1 October 1960. Further expansion took place on 1 April 1962, when Frome RDC was taken over, and the undertakings of Frome UDC, Street UDC and Burnham-on-Sea UDC following on 1 October.

The severe winter of 1962 caused 668 burst mains across the company's supply area in 76 days.  Water had to be carted through the streets of Bristol to try and meet demand.  In April 1963 a reception at the Council House thanked staff, contractors, drivers and volunteers who had helped.

On 5 October 2011, a subsidiary of Capstone Infrastructure Corporation acquired a 70% interest in Bristol Water from Grupo Agbar, who retained a 30% interest in the company. On 10 May 2012, a subsidiary of Itochu Corporation acquired a 20% indirect interest in Bristol Water. Today, iCON Infrastructure have agreed to acquire a 30 percent stake in Bristol Water from Suez, bringing the 10-year relationship with Agbar (now part of Suez) to a natural end, following the takeover in 2006 and the sale of a 70 percent stake in 2011. In 2018, Bristol Water was owned by iCON Infrastructure Partners III, L.P. (50 percent), iCON Infrastructure Partners III (Bristol), L.P. (30 percent) and Itochu Corporation (20 percent) and is a plc with company number 02662226. Bristol Water is one of very few water companies in the UK that has remained in private ownership since its inception.

Archives
Records of Bristol Waterworks Company and Bristol Water are held at Bristol Archives (Ref. 40619) (online catalogue). Further records are held at The National Archives (United Kingdom).

Bibliography

References

External links

Companies based in Bristol
Companies established in 1846
Water companies of England
1846 establishments in England
2021 mergers and acquisitions